Lamesa High School is a public high school located in Lamesa, Texas and classified as a 3A school by the University Interscholastic League (UIL). It is part of the Lamesa Independent School District located in central Dawson County. In 2013, the school received a "B Rating" by the Texas Education Agency.

Athletics
The Lamesa Tornadoes compete in the following sports:

Baseball
Basketball
Cross Country
Football
Golf
Powerlifting
Softball
Track and Field
Volleyball
Tennis

State Titles
Boys Basketball 
1960(3A), 1967(3A), 1975(3A)
Girls Golf 
1999(3A)
Volleyball 
1986(4A)

Notable alumni

Kilmer B. Corbin, attorney and Texas state senator, father of actor Barry Corbin
Preston Smith, governor of Texas from 1969 to 1972

References

External links
Lamesa ISD

Public high schools in Texas
Schools in Dawson County, Texas